The following highways are numbered 882:

United States